These Days Tour was Bon Jovi's concert tour during 1995-96. Van Halen opened as a special guest for Bon Jovi on twenty of the European stadium dates during the second leg promoting their album Balance. The last of the three Wembley Stadium gigs was filmed for the DVD Live From London. The band played 131 shows in 35 countries all across the world. The tour was the first with current bassist Hugh McDonald.

Personnel
Jon Bon Jovi - lead vocals, guitar, maracas for Keep the Faith, tambourine for Hey God
Richie Sambora - lead guitar, backing vocals, talkbox, lead vocals for Stranger In This Town
Hugh McDonald - bass guitar, backing vocals
Tico Torres - drums, percussion, lead vocals for Crazy
David Bryan - keyboards, backing vocals, tambourine for Something to Believe In

Set list
The set list varied on a nightly basis on this tour, but usually featured several songs from the These Days'' album, such as "Hey God", "Something for the Pain", and "This Ain't a Love Song". It also included many of their hits from the 1980s such as "Livin' on a Prayer", "You Give Love a Bad Name", and "Bad Medicine".
 "Livin' on a Prayer"
 "You Give Love a Bad Name"
 "Hey God"
 "Keep the Faith"
 "Always"
 "Bed of Roses"
 "Blood on Blood"
 "Blaze of Glory" (cover)
 "Runaway"
 "Something for the Pain"
 "Lay Your Hands on Me"
 "Someday I'll Be Saturday Night"
 "I'll Sleep When I'm Dead" (with snippets of "Jumpin' Jack Flash" and "Papa Was a Rollin' Stone")
 "Bad Medicine" / "Shout"
Encore
 "Always"
 "These Days"
 "With a Little Help from My Friends" (cover)
Encore 2
  "Wanted Dead or Alive"
 "This Ain't a Love Song"

Tour dates

Box office score data

The total attendance of the 3 South African shows was 182,000.

Cancelled dates

References

Bon Jovi concert tours
1995 concert tours
1996 concert tours